The Lija Belvedere Tower, officially Torri Belvedere, is a belvedere in Lija, Malta. It was built in the 19th century as a folly within a private garden, and it is now located on a roundabout.

History

The belvedere tower was built in 1857 as a folly within the gardens of Villa Gourigon, a 17th-century villa which belonged to the Marquis Depiro. It was designed by the architect Giuseppe Bonavia.

In the 1950s, part of the villa's garden was destroyed to make way for Transfiguration Avenue. The belvedere was retained as a roundabout, and it is now one of Lija's landmarks.

The tower was restored in 1995 and 1996, and it is listed as a Grade 1 property by the Malta Environment and Planning Authority. It is also listed on the National Inventory of the Cultural Property of the Maltese Islands as part of Villa Gourgion.

References

Folly towers
Towers in Malta
Lija
Buildings and structures completed in 1857
Roundabouts and traffic circles in Malta
1857 establishments in Malta